Franck Comba (born March 16, 1971, in Hyeres) is a former French rugby union player. He played as centre.

Comba began playing with RC Toulon. He moved to Stade Français with Christophe Dominici, where he played from 1997/98 to 2002/03. He won the Top 14 in 1997/98, 1999/2000 and 2002/03, and the Coupe de France in 1999.

He had 13 caps for France, from 1998 to 2001, scoring two tries and 10 points in aggregate. He earned his first cap on June 13, 1998, in a 35-18 win with Argentina at Buenos Aires, in a tour. He had his last cap at the 22-15 loss to Ireland on 17 February 2001 for the 2001 Six Nations Championship in Dublin.

Honours
 Stade Français
French Rugby Union Championship/Top 14: 1997–98, 1999–2000

References

French rugby union players
France international rugby union players
1971 births
Living people
People from Le Chesnay
Sportspeople from Yvelines
Rugby union centres